Margareta Persson (1945 – 18 March 2015) was a Swedish social democratic politician from Jonköping. She had been a member of the Riksdag since 1994.

References

External links
Margareta Persson at the Riksdag website

Members of the Riksdag from the Social Democrats
2015 deaths
1945 births
Women members of the Riksdag
20th-century Swedish women politicians
20th-century Swedish politicians
21st-century Swedish women politicians